In grammar, the Instrumental-comitative case combines the instrumental case and the comitative case at the same time, functioning similar to the English preposition "with". It may indicate the means of the action (for example, "with a knife", "using a fork", "by tram") and the person in whose company the action is carried out (for example, "with his family"), as well as other meanings such as the temporal or the modal.

The instrumental-comitative case exists in the Hungarian language.

Grammatical cases